Boris Cipusev (born Ljubljana 1988) is an Australian artist known for his highly detailed and colourful drawings in felt-tip pen and watercolour pencil. His work often incorporates text sourced from signage and advertising billboards, which he encounters in the commute between his residence in the suburb of Preston and his Northcote-based studio at Arts Project Australia, where he has worked since 2007.  A series of his text-based works were acquired for the collection of the National Gallery of Victoria in 2014, and appeared in their blockbuster exhibition of contemporary art, Melbourne Now, in the same year.

Career, themes and style 
Since 2007, Cipusev has been a regular studio artist at Arts Project Australia (APA), an organisation devoted to supporting and promoting artists with an intellectual disability.  Although he received no formal training prior to commencing his studio residency there, his participation in the program at APA has provided him with access to fine art materials and the informal tuition provided by the practicing artists employed by the organisation. Shortly following the commencement of his work at APA he began exhibiting regularly in Australia and participated in his first international group exhibitions in 2014, in the Scotland and Canada (see EXHIBITIONS). In 2013, David Hurlston, Curator of Australian art at the National Gallery of Victoria (NGV), selected a series of fifty drawings, entitled Who Next? (2010), for the landmark exhibition Melbourne Now.  These works were also acquired for the collection of the NGV.  Since that time Cipusev has continued to exhibit his work at the APA gallery and at La Trobe University.

Cipusev’s drawings have been noted for their visual representations of text. The works usually consist of a carefully placed word drawn in highly coloured felt-tip pen against a white background. His manner of combining multiple word or word-number combinations which are open for deciphering and interpretation by viewers, has seen his work described as “enigmatic” and “poetic.” His works are typically inspired by his immediate environment; advertising in the landscape, objects in his domestic home and workplace, television, the names of people he knows or figures from popular culture.

Selected group exhibitions 
 Paper Projects, La Trobe University, Melbourne, 2016
 That’s Funny, Arts Project Australia Gallery, Melbourne, 2015
 Connected, Yarra Gallery, Federation Square, Melbourne, 2014
 Melbourne Art Fair, Royal Exhibition Building, Melbourne, 2008 – 2014
 The Soft Knife, Casula Powerhouse Arts Centre, NSW, 2014
 Turning the Page, Gallery 101, Ottawa, Ontario, Canada, 2014
 Hybrid Making – new work from Australia, Canada, Scotland, Project Ability Gallery, Scotland, 2014
 Melbourne Now, National Gallery of Victoria, Melbourne, 2013 – 2014
 Repeat, Restate… Reiterate, Arts Project Australia Gallery, Melbourne, 2013
 Detours through abstraction, Arts Project Australia Gallery, Melbourne, 2011
 High Views, Northern Exposure Festival, Northcote Town Hall, Melbourne, 2010
 Hidden, Arts Project Australia Gallery, Melbourne, 2010
 Frank and Friends, Sheffer Gallery, Sydney, 2010
 Licorice Allsorts, King Street Gallery on William, Sydney, 2009
 Studio Days, Arts Project Australia Gallery, Melbourne, 2007

Collections 
 National Gallery of Victoria, AUS

External links 
 https://www.ngv.gov.au/explore/collection/artist/25730/ 
 https://www.youtube.com/watch?v=Zyh7jZ65jgk 
 https://www.flairmelbourne.com/sofitel-melbourne-on-collins 
 https://www.artslant.com/global/artists/show/319358-boris-cipusev

References 

Outsider artists
1988 births
Artists from Melbourne
Living people